Jaramana is a city in southern Syria, administratively part of the Rif Dimashq Governorate in the Ghouta plain. Its location, 3 kilometers southeast of the Syrian capital, makes it a bustling town in the greater Damascus metropolitan area, with a mostly Christian and Druze population. It is adjacent to the Jaramana Camp, a Palestinian refugee camp.

History
Jaramana was visited by Syrian geographer Yaqut al-Hamawi in the early 13th-century and noted it was "a district of the Ghautah of Damascus."

In late 2012, the neoconservative Institute for the Study of War said there had been reports of Popular Committees (local self-defense militias formed to defend communities from armed extremists) and pro-government Shabiha working closely with government forces there. On October 29 and November 28, 2012 the town was hit by car bombings killing over 100 civilian residents, including, several Iraqi and Palestinian refugees.

Demographics
Since 2003 and the beginning of the Iraq War, large numbers of Iraqi have immigrated to Jaramana, swelling the population from around 100,000 to over 250,000. According to the 2004 official census, the population of the city was 114,363.

There is also a Palestinian refugee camp near the town bearing its same name. Jaramana is a favorite destination for Iraqi Assyrian Christian refugees fleeing their unstable country. In October 2006, the Assyrian community in Jaramana finally received a priest from Mosul, Iraq. The priest, Arkan Hana Hakim, claims there are now 2,000 Assyrian Iraqi refugees in the town Jaramana alone.

References

Bibliography

External links
Jaramana News
Pictures taken in Jaramana Refugee Camp

Cities in Syria
Palestinian refugee camps in Syria
Populated places in Markaz Rif Dimashq District
Druze communities in Syria